The 2015 Malaysia Cup Final was a football match which was played on 12 December 2015, to determine the champion of the 2015 Malaysia Cup. It was the final of the 89th edition of the Malaysia Cup, competition organised by the Football Association of Malaysia.

The final was played between Selangor and Kedah. Selangor won the cup after beating Kedah 2–0 with a brace from Ahmad Hazwan Bakri.

Venue
The final was held at the Shah Alam Stadium.

Road to final

Note: In all results below, the score of the finalist is given first.

Match details

References

External links
FAM Official website

Malaysia Cup seasons
2015 in Malaysian football